Stanley Nka Ohawuchi (born 27 May 1990) is a Nigerian footballer who plays for Saudi club Al-Shaeib as a striker.

Career
On 17 September 2022, Stanley joined Al-Washm. He was released on 26 January 2023.

International career
Ohawuchi represented his homeland Nigeria at the 2009 FIFA U-20 World Cup in Egypt.

Career Statistics

Club

Honours

Club
Zamalek
Egypt Cup: 2016
Egyptian Super Cup: 2017

References

External links

1990 births
Living people
Nigerian footballers
Nigeria under-20 international footballers
Association football forwards
CD Atlético Baleares footballers
Sliema Wanderers F.C. players
Wadi Degla SC players
Zamalek SC players
Nigerian expatriate footballers
Expatriate footballers in Spain
Nigerian expatriate sportspeople in Spain
Expatriate footballers in Malta
Nigerian expatriate sportspeople in Malta
Expatriate footballers in Egypt
Nigerian expatriate sportspeople in Egypt
Expatriate footballers in Saudi Arabia
Nigerian expatriate sportspeople in Saudi Arabia
Expatriate footballers in the United Arab Emirates
Nigerian expatriate sportspeople in the United Arab Emirates
Al-Qadsiah FC players
Ajman Club players
Al-Washm Club players
Al Shaeib Club players
Egyptian Premier League players
Saudi Professional League players
UAE Pro League players
Saudi First Division League players
Saudi Second Division players